Robert Jackson Bennett (born 1984) is an American writer of speculative fiction.

Early life and education
Robert Jackson Bennett was born in Baton Rouge, Louisiana. He graduated from the University of Texas with special honors in English in 2005, and settled down in Austin, Texas.

Career
Bennett's debut as an author was the novel Mr. Shivers (2010). He went on to write The Company Man (2011), The Troupe (2012), and American Elsewhere (2013).

Bennett's fifth novel, City of Stairs (2014), was the first of a fantasy trilogy, The Divine Cities, followed by City of Blades (2016) and City of Miracles (2017).  The Divine Cities was nominated for Best Series by the Hugo Awards in 2018, but lost to World of the Five Gods by Lois McMaster Bujold.

In August 2018, Bennett published Foundryside, the first installment of his new series, The Founders Trilogy.

Awards and nominations

Bibliography

Novels 
Mr. Shivers (2010; Orbit). 
The Company Man (2011; Orbit). 
The Troupe (2012; Orbit).
 American Elsewhere (2013; Orbit).

The Divine Cities trilogy 
 City of Stairs (2014; Broadway Books)
 City of Blades (2016)
 City of Miracles (2017)

The Founders trilogy 
 Foundryside (2018)
 Shorefall (2020)
 Locklands (2022)

Short fiction 

 "A Drink for Teddy Ford", first published in Broken Time Blues: Fantastic Tales in the Roaring '20s, Absolute Xpress, 2011 
 "To Be Read Upon Your Waking", first published in Subterranean Magazine, Summer 2012
 "Hollow Choices", with David Liss, first published in Dark Duets: All-New Tales of Horror and Dark Fantasy, Harper Voyager, 2014
 Vigilance, Tor.com, 2019
 In the Shadows of Men, Subterranean Press, 2020

References

External links

1984 births
Living people
21st-century American male writers
21st-century American novelists
American fantasy writers
American male novelists
Edgar Award winners
Novelists from Louisiana
Novelists from Texas
University of Texas at Austin alumni
Writers from Austin, Texas
Writers from Baton Rouge, Louisiana